The 21st Lumières Awards ceremony, presented by the Académie des Lumières, was held on 8 February 2016, at the Espace Pierre Cardin in Paris to honour the best in French films of 2015. Nominees were announced on 4 January 2016. My Golden Days garnered the most nominations, with a total of seven.

Mustang won four awards, out of its six nominations, including Best Film and Best First Film.

Winners and nominees

Films with multiple nominations and awards

The following films received multiple nominations:

The following films received multiple awards:

See also
 41st César Awards
 6th Magritte Awards

References

External links
 
 
 Lumières Awards at AlloCiné

Lumières Awards
Lumières
Lumières